Awang Semaun Secondary School (abbreviated as ), is a co-educational government secondary school located in Kampong Sungai Kebun, Brunei.

Etymology 
The school is named after Awang Semaun, a legendary figure of Brunei.

History

Awang Semaun Secondary School was established in March 1982 by the name 'Sungai Kebun English Secondary School'. It was first located at the present Paduka Seri Begawan Sultan Science College before it moved to its current location on 3 February 1983. On 13 December 1984 marked its official opening by the then Minister of Education, Yang Berhormat Pehin Orang Kaya Laila Wijaya Dato Seri Setia Haji Awang Abdul Aziz. The occasion was marked by the renaming of the school as Sekolah Menengah Awang Semaun (Awang Semaun Secondary School), a tribute to a Brunei legendary hero.

Academic 
The school follows the national Secondary Schools' curriculum of the SPN-21 (Sistem Pendidikan Abad ke-21) starting 2007. Under this system, students study a two-year common curriculum in Year 7 and Year 8 and are then channelled to five streams namely Express (two years programme), General Science (three years), General Programme (3 years), General Applied (3 years) and Special Applied (Edexcel) Programme. Channelling is determined by the results of the Students' Progress Examination at the end of Year 8.

At the end of Year 11 (Year 10 for the Express stream), students sit for GCE 'O' Level and/or IGCSE examination. Passing the examination may allow students to proceed to sixth form. Alternatively, students may also opt for public vocational education at IBTE schools.

Staff
The teaching staff consists is locals and a small group of expatriates (CfBT and contract teachers). Supporting them are the auxiliary staff working on the maintenance and the technical side of the school.

Facilities
Faculty of BTEC:
 Art and Design Studio
 Hospitality Room
 Business and Retail Administration Room
 Numeracy Room
 Linguistic Room
 ITQ1 and ITQ2 Labs
 Multi-purpose hall – air conditioned. Able to hold about 1500 to 2000 occupants at one time. 
Library with 30 thousand books and the following rooms:
 A-Team Room – Students’ Action Team Room.
 Multi-Media Centre
 Mobitel Room with 40 units of i-books and a projector.
 Mini Conference Room – to hold 15 to 20 occupants
Sports Centre:
 Football field - artificial turf 
 Jogging Track - tarmaced
 Netball/basketball courts
 Futsal court - artificial turf 
 Takraw court
Resource rooms:
 BIPEM (Bilik Pengajian Melayu)
 English centre with a reading room. and mural project drawn by students of Jerudong International School students. 
 Media room – with Smartboard, projector, TV and DVD Player.
 Business, Art and Technology (BAT) Room
 Travel and Tourism Room
 Home Economics Room
 Art Resource Room
Other resources:
 Science Labs
 Pre-Vocational Room with Homeroom teachers.
 Design and Technology Workshop
 Five lecture rooms – For subjects such as History, Geography, Business Studies and Travel & Tourism.
 Conference Room to hold 130 occupants, with projector, visualiser and air conditioners.
 Staff lounge to hold 60 occupants.
 Canteen
 Surau - with two separate ablution rooms for male and female
 Sickbay - two separate rooms for male and female. 
 Counselor Rooms

At the end of each school day the school campus is a venue for religious classes administered by the government.

See also 
 List of secondary schools in Brunei

References

External links 
 Sekolah Menengah Awang Semaun Official website

Secondary schools in Brunei
Educational institutions established in 1983
1983 establishments in Brunei
Cambridge schools in Brunei